Cold Lake 149C is an Indian reserve of the Cold Lake First Nations in Alberta, located within the Municipal District of Bonnyville No. 87.

References

Indian reserves in Alberta